Brandenburg tram stop is located on line B of the Tramway de Bordeaux. The stop is located on Rue Joseph Brunet in the city of Bordeaux and is operated by Transports Bordeaux Métropole.

For most of the day on Mondays to Fridays, trams run at least every five minutes in both directions. Services run less frequently in the early morning, late evenings, weekends and public holidays.

The tram stop has two tracks and two side platforms.

Close by 
 Mairie du quartier
 La Poste
 Lidl

References 

Bordeaux tramway stops
Tram stops in Bordeaux
Railway stations in France opened in 2008